The Carebaco Junior International Badminton Championships is an open junior U19 tournament organized yearly since 2013 at the Carebaco Games by the Caribbean Regional Badminton Confederation (CAREBACO) normally one week prior to the Carebaco International.

The tournament is an event for under 19 year old junior individual players The Pan Am event  is part of the BWF Future juniors series and therefore eligible for BWF Junior World Ranking Points.  Member countries of Carebaco can apply in advance as candidates to organize the event as part of the complete yearly held Carebaco Games.

Gold medal winners individual Carebaco Junior U19 open badminton Championships

References

External links
Badminton Pan American

Badminton tournaments
Sports competitions in the Americas
Recurring sporting events established in 2013
2013 establishments in North America